The North American Numbering Plan (NANP) divides the territories of its members into geographic numbering plan areas (NPAs). Each NPA is identified by one or more numbering plan area codes (NPA codes, or area codes), consisting of three digits that are prefixed to each local telephone number having seven digits. A numbering plan area with multiple area codes is called an overlay. Area codes are also assigned for non-geographic purposes. The rules for numbering NPAs do not permit the digits 0 and 1 in the leading position. Area codes with two identical trailing digits are easily recognizable codes (ERC). NPAs with 9 in the second position are reserved for future format expansion.

Area codes in numerical order 
Area codes that are not in use are listed in italic type face; and unassignable codes are bolded.

200–299

300–399

400–499

500–599

600–699

700–799

800–899

900–999

Area codes by country, state, province, and regions 
Future area codes are in italic type face.

United States

Canada

Caribbean and Atlantic islands

U.S. Pacific territories

Non-geographic area codes

Summary table

Assignment actions by year

See also 
 List of future North American area codes
 Original North American area codes
 Telephone numbers in the Americas

References 

Canada communications-related lists
Communication-related lists
North American Numbering Plan
United States communications-related lists